Chez Viking is the fourth studio album by American post-rock band The Mercury Program, released in 2009 on Lovitt Records; seven years after their previous album A Data Learn the Language.

Track listing

2009 albums
The Mercury Program albums